The 2010 Nord LB Open was a professional tennis tournament played on outdoor red clay courts. This was the 17th edition of the tournament which is part of the 2010 ATP Challenger Tour. It took place in Braunschweig, Germany between 28 June and 4 July 2010.

ATP entrants

Seeds

 Rankings are as of June 21, 2010.

Other entrants
The following players received wildcards into the singles main draw:
  Jaan-Frederik Brunken
  Gastón Gaudio
  Peter Gojowczyk
  Thomas Muster

The following player received entry as a special exempt:
  Simone Vagnozzi

The following players received entry from the qualifying draw:
  Marco Mirnegg
  Robin Vik
  Filip Prpic
  Leonardo Tavares (as a Lucky Loser)
  Gabriel Trujillo-Soler

Champions

Singles

 Mikhail Kukushkin def.  Marcos Daniel, 6–2, 3–0 retired

Doubles

 Leonardo Tavares /  Simone Vagnozzi def.  Igor Kunitsyn /  Yuri Schukin 7–5, 7–6(4)

References
Official Site

Nord LB Open
Sparkassen Open
2010s in Lower Saxony
2010 in German tennis